Warnstorfia is a genus of mosses. It was named in honor of Carl Friedrich Warnstorf.

References

Plants described in 1907
Moss genera
Hypnales